Alhaji Ibrahim Ben Kargbo (born October 18, 1944), commonly known as I.B. Kargbo, is a Sierra Leonean journalist and politician. He currently  the MP of constituency 030(Bombali District)  Ernest Bai Koroma. I.B Kargbo is a close personal friend of president Ernest Bai Koroma and former president Ahmad Tejan Kabbah.  I.B. Kargbo is one of the most trusted aides to president Koroma. He has a Bachelor's degree in journalism from Fourah Bay College and a Diploma in Journalism from John New Homes School of Journalism, 1979.

I.B. Kargbo is the owner of one of Sierra Leone's most read newspapers, The New Citizen. Until his appointment as Minister, he was a regular columnist in his own newspaper. As a journalist, he publicly opposed the Public Order Act of 1965.

Early life and education
Alhaji Ibrahim Ben Kargbo was born on October 18, 1944 in Makeni, Bombali District in the Northern Province of Sierra Leone. He is a member of the Madingo ethnic group and he is a descendant of Port Loko Baker Loko Chiefdom, Port Loko District in Northern Sierra Leone. I.B. Kargbo attended St. Andrew's Secondary School in Bo.

He graduated from Fourah Bay College in 1969 with a Bachelor's degree in journalism. He also has a Diploma in Journalism from John New Homes School of Journalism in 1979.

References

External links
http://www.africa-confidential.com/whos-who-profile/id/2276
http://allafrica.com/stories/200905150851.html

Government ministers of Sierra Leone
Sierra Leonean journalists
Living people
1947 births
All People's Congress politicians
People from Bombali District
People from Freetown